Rivaldo Vítor Mosca Ferreira Júnior (born 29 April 1995), commonly known as Rivaldinho, is a Brazilian professional footballer who plays as a forward for Romanian club Universitatea Craiova.

Club career

Early career
After playing youth football for Mogi Mirim and Corinthians, Rivaldinho began his senior career at Mogi Mirim making 47 appearances in all competitions for the club.

He then moved to Portuguese club Boavista in August 2015, where he made just one league appearance (versus Moreirense) and two appearances in the domestic cups (versus Feirense and Operário).

Rivaldinho joined XV de Piracicaba on 18 January 2016. He appeared in 12 matches in the Campeonato Paulista for Piracicaba, scoring three goals, before departing on 12 April. He was signed by Internacional on 10 May 2016, but spent the end of the season on loan at Paysandu.

In Romania and Bulgaria
On 7 February 2017, Rivaldinho returned to Europe, signing a -year contract with Romanian team Dinamo București.

He scored his first goal for the club on 5 April, in a 2–0 league win against CFR Cluj. On 27 July 2017, in a Europa League qualifying game against Athletic Bilbao, Rivaldinho scored from a "terrific" long–range effort to earn Dinamo a 1–1 draw against the Spanish team.

On 27 January 2018, Rivaldinho signed a -year contract with Bulgarian club Levski Sofia. He was on one of the club's largest salaries, but suffered from injuries.

In January 2019 he returned to Romania joining Viitorul Constanța on loan. He signed permanently for the club in July 2019.

Poland
In August 2020, he signed for Polish club Cracovia. On 20 July 2022, he left the club by mutual consent.

Return to Romania
On 26 July 2022, Universitatea Craiova announced the signing of Rivaldinho on a two-year contract.

Personal life
Rivaldinho is the son of Rose Mosca, and former Brazil and FC Barcelona player, Rivaldo. Both he and his father scored in the same Brazilian Série B game for Mogi Mirim in July 2015.

Career statistics

Honours

Club
Dinamo București
Cupa Ligii: 2016–17
Levski Sofia
Bulgarian Cup runner-up: 2017–18
Viitorul Constanța
Cupa României: 2018–19
Cracovia
Polish Super Cup: 2020

References

External links
 Rivaldinho at LevskiSofia.info
 
 

1995 births
Living people
Footballers from São Paulo
Brazilian footballers
Association football forwards
Mogi Mirim Esporte Clube players
Boavista F.C. players
Esporte Clube XV de Novembro (Piracicaba) players
Sport Club Internacional players
Paysandu Sport Club players
FC Dinamo București players
PFC Levski Sofia players
FC Viitorul Constanța players
MKS Cracovia (football) players
CS Universitatea Craiova players
Campeonato Brasileiro Série B players
Campeonato Brasileiro Série C players
Primeira Liga players
Liga I players
First Professional Football League (Bulgaria) players
Ekstraklasa players
III liga players
Brazilian expatriate footballers
Brazilian expatriate sportspeople in Portugal
Expatriate footballers in Portugal
Brazilian expatriate sportspeople in Romania
Expatriate footballers in Romania
Brazilian expatriate sportspeople in Bulgaria
Expatriate footballers in Bulgaria
Brazilian expatriate sportspeople in Poland
Expatriate footballers in Poland
Sport Club Corinthians Paulista players